The 2018 International Championship was a professional ranking snooker tournament, taking place from 28 October to 4 November 2018 in Daqing, China. It was the seventh ranking event of the 2018/2019 season.

Qualifying for the tournament took place between 9–12 October 2018 in Barnsley Metrodome, Barnsley.

Defending champion Mark Selby lost to Neil Robertson 4–6 in the quarter-final, bringing an end to his 2-year reign and an 18 match unbeaten record in the tournament.

Mark Allen won the tournament with record 14 century breaks, beating Robertson 10–5 in the final. It was Allen's fourth ranking title.

Prize fund
The breakdown of prize money for this year is shown below:

 Winner: £175,000
 Runner-up: £75,000
 Semi-final: £32,000
 Quarter-final: £21,500
 Last 16: £13,500
 Last 32: £8,500
 Last 64: £4,000

 Televised highest break: £3,000
 Total: £775,000

The "rolling 147 prize" for a maximum break: £5,000

Main draw

Final

Qualifying
Matches were played between 9 and 12 October 2018 at the Barnsley Metrodome in Barnsley, England. Matches involving Mark Selby, Noppon Saengkham, Liang Wenbo, Ding Junhui, Ben Woollaston, Liam Highfield, Gary Wilson and Mark Williams, were played in China. All matches best of 11 frames.

Century breaks

Qualifying stage centuries
Total: 47

 144  Matthew Selt
 142, 117, 117  Xiao Guodong
 137  Martin Gould
 135  Michael Holt
 135  Martin O'Donnell 
 134, 109  Mark Davis
 134  Ryan Day
 133, 106  Chris Wakelin
 132  Anthony McGill
 130  Peter Ebdon
 130  Adam Stefanow
 128, 101  Neil Robertson
 127, 107  Sam Craigie
 127  Andrew Higginson
 126  Oliver Lines
 125  Elliot Slessor
 123, 112  Stuart Bingham
 116  Sam Baird
 114  Tom Ford
 113, 100  Lu Ning
 113  Stephen Maguire
 111  Luo Honghao
 110, 104  Robert Milkins
 108, 105  Hossein Vafaei
 108  Sunny Akani
 107  Xu Si
 106  Michael Georgiou
 105, 102, 100  Judd Trump
 104  Ali Carter
 104  Mei Xiwen
 104  Fergal O'Brien
 102  Eden Sharav
 101, 100  Kurt Maflin
 100  Michael White

Televised stage centuries
Total: 107

 146, 142, 129, 127, 125, 120, 120, 119, 112, 108, 103, 102, 101, 101  Mark Allen
 144, 127, 127, 115, 110  Matthew Stevens
 142, 137  Alfie Burden
 140, 107, 106  Michael Holt
 139, 103  Martin Gould
 137, 133, 131, 124, 117, 102, 100  Mark Selby
 137, 116, 104  Zhao Xintong
 137, 104  Yan Bingtao
 136  Hossein Vafaei
 135, 127, 125, 121, 119, 113, 113, 113, 101, 101  Neil Robertson
 135  Zhou Yuelong
 133, 128, 112, 106, 106, 103, 102  Jack Lisowski
 133, 111  Ryan Day
 132, 107  Ali Carter
 132, 105  Barry Hawkins
 131, 123  Chang Bingyu
 131  Li Yuan
 130  Stuart Bingham
 130  Liang Wenbo
 129  Graeme Dott
 128, 112  Ding Junhui
 128  Mark King
 124, 103  Jimmy Robertson
 123, 119, 104  Judd Trump
 122, 116, 106  Stuart Carrington
 122  Liam Highfield
 121  Ben Woollaston
 116, 108, 105, 100  Marco Fu
 116, 105, 104  Eden Sharav
 112  Robert Milkins
 110, 108, 108, 101  Noppon Saengkham
 110, 108, 101, 101  Sunny Akani
 110  Jordan Brown
 110  Joe Perry
 106, 100  Tom Ford
 106  Mark Williams
 106  Luo Honghao
 101  Stephen Maguire
 101  Martin O'Donnell
 100  He Guoqiang

Notes

References

2018
2018 in snooker
2018 in Chinese sport
Sport in Daqing
October 2018 sports events in Asia
November 2018 sports events in Asia